Bolshoye Savino is a rural locality (a village) in Savinskoye Rural Settlement, Permsky District, Perm Krai, Russia. The population was 675 as of 2010. There are 17 streets.

Geography 
Bolshoye Savino is located 18 km southwest of Perm (the district's administrative centre) by road. Krokhovo is the nearest rural locality.

References 

Rural localities in Permsky District